Lloyd Bourgeois (January 24, 1903 – September 19, 1968) was an American athlete. He competed in the men's triple jump at the 1928 Summer Olympics.

References

External links
 

1903 births
1968 deaths
Athletes (track and field) at the 1928 Summer Olympics
American male triple jumpers
Olympic track and field athletes of the United States
Track and field athletes from New Orleans